Muckno Lake, also known as Lough Muckno, is a freshwater lake in the northeast of Ireland. It is located in County Monaghan beside the town of Castleblayney.

Geography and hydrology
It flows out to the Clarebane River, which connects the lake to nearby Lough Ross.

Natural history
Fish species in Muckno Lake include European perch, common roach, common bream, gudgeon, northern pike and the critically endangered European eel.

See also
List of loughs in Ireland

References

Muckno